Amidu Salifu (born September 20, 1992) is a Ghanaian professional footballer who plays as midfielder.

Club career

Vicenza Calcio
Salifu started his youth career with Italian club Vicenza Calcio and made his debut with the senior squad in the 2010–11 Serie B season before going on to sign for ACF Fiorentina in January 2011. He made eight league appearances for the biancorossi prior to his transfer.

Fiorentina
Following his transfer to the Florence-based club, Salifu was hardly utilized as a first team member. The young midfielder made his Serie A debut for Fiorentina on 23 April 2011 in a match against Cagliari, when he came on as a 90th minute substitute for former club captain, Adrian Mutu. He would eventually go on to make an additional 12 appearances throughout the 2011–12 Serie A season, before being loaned to Calcio Catania in June 2012. He has made 11 appearances in all competitions  for the club since his arrival, generally serving as a reserve for the likes of Sergio Almirón, Francesco Lodi, and Marco Biagianti.

In the summer of 2019, he moved to Kuwaiti club Al-Salmiya on loan.

References

External links
 
 

1992 births
Living people
Ghanaian footballers
Association football midfielders
Ghanaian expatriate footballers
Expatriate footballers in Italy
Serie A players
Serie B players
Serie C players
Liga II players
L.R. Vicenza players
ACF Fiorentina players
Catania S.S.D. players
Modena F.C. players
A.C. Perugia Calcio players
Brescia Calcio players
Mantova 1911 players
S.S. Arezzo players
Al Salmiya SC players
FC Petrolul Ploiești players
Kelantan United F.C. players
Expatriate footballers in Kuwait
Expatriate footballers in Romania
Kuwait Premier League players
Ghanaian expatriate sportspeople in Kuwait
Ghanaian expatriate sportspeople in Romania
Ghanaian expatriate sportspeople in Italy